Franklin Square is an unincorporated community in central Salem Township, Columbiana County, Ohio, United States.

History
A post office called Franklin Square was established in 1830, and remained in operation until 1914. Besides the post office, Franklin Square had several shops, a church and schoolhouse.

References

Unincorporated communities in Columbiana County, Ohio
1830 establishments in Ohio
Populated places established in 1830
Unincorporated communities in Ohio